Josef Jennewein (21 November 1919 – 27 July 1943) was a German alpine skier and world champion. During World War II, he served first in the Wehrmacht and then in the Luftwaffe, and was credited with 86 air victories. He was awarded the Knight's Cross of the Iron Cross of Nazi Germany.

Early life and sports career
Jennewein was born on 21 November 1919 at St Anton in the Tyrolean Alps, Austria. He became a world champion in the combined event in Zakopane in 1939, and received silver medals in slalom and in downhill. In 1941 Jennewein participated at the FIS Alpine World Ski Championships 1941 in Cortina d'Ampezzo, Italy and won gold medals in downhill and the combined event. In 1946, the results were cancelled by the FIS because of the limited number of participants from only German-friendly countries during World War II.

World War II
Jennewein joined the Luftwaffe as a fighter pilot and was posted to 4. Einsatzstaffel of Jagdfliegerschule 5 (JFS 5—5th Fighter Pilot School). In June 1941, most of the Luftwaffe fighter units were transferred east in preparation for Operation Barbarossa, the invasion of the Soviet Union launched on 22 June 1941. To augment the remaining fighter units fighting on the Western Front, JFS 5 was tasked with creation of a fourth squadron named 4. Einsatzstaffel — action or combat squadron — in June 1941. The Einsatzstaffel was placed under the command of Oberleutnant Fülbert Zink. In early July, the Einsatzstaffel transferred to Octeville-sur-Mer, north of Le Havre. There, 4. Einsatzstaffel was subordinated to the Stab (headquarters unit) of Jagdgeschwader 2 "Richthofen" (JG 2—2nd Fighter Wing) and flew fighter protection in the area of Le Havre. Initially, 4. Einsatzstaffel was equipped with the Messerschmitt Bf 109 E-4 and E-7, later with the Bf 109 F-1 and F-2.

On 20 September 1941, the Royal Air Force (RAF) flew three "Circus" operations named No. 100A, 100B and 100C, against various targets in northern France. Circus No. 100A headed for the Hazebrouck marshalling yards, "Circus" No. 100B attacked the Abbeville marshalling yards, and Circus 100C targeted the shipyards at Rouen. Following the days actions, pilots on both sides overclaimed the number of aerial victories. That day, flying his fourth combat mission, Jennewein claimed three Supermarine Spitfire fighters shot down near Fécamp. On 15 October, the RAF flew "Ramrod" No. 69 mission against the Le Havre docks. Twelve Bristol Blenheim bombers from Westhampnett, escorted by Spitfire fighters from No. 234 Squadron, were intercepted by Bf 109 Luftwaffe fighters. In this encounter, Jennewein claimed the destruction of a Spitfire fighter and a Blenheim bomber.

Eastern Front
On 28 January 1942, Jennewein was posted to 2. Staffel (2nd squadron) of Jagdgeschwader 51 (JG 51—51st Fighter Wing) and transferred on the Eastern Front. At the time, 2. Staffel was commanded by Oberleutnant Friedhelm Höschen who was transferred in March and handed command of the Staffel to Leutnant Erwin Fleig. The Staffel was subordinated to I. Gruppe (1st group) of JG 51 and was based at Staraya Russa. By the end of July 1942, when he was posted to serve as a flight instructor, he had added 12 Russian aircraft to his tally. He returned to 2./JG 51 before the end of the year, starting a surprising sequence of multiple victories. On 18 January 1943, as a Feldwebel, flying a Focke-Wulf Fw 190 as a wingman of Leutnant Joachim Brendel, he attacked a formation of nine Petlyakov Pe-2 bombers from 202 BAP, in the area of Velikiye Luki, and claimed five kills in five minutes (Brendel claimed three, actual Soviet losses were six).

On 27 July 1943, Jennewein claimed his 86th and last aerial victory when he shot down an Ilyushin Il-2 ground-attack aircraft. Shortly after, he was posted as missing in action when his Focke Wulf Fw 190 A-6 (Werknummer 550182 —factory number) was shot down by another Il-2 in aerial combat northwest of Mtsensk.

Summary of military career

Aerial victory claims
According to US historian David T. Zabecki, Jennewein was credited with 86 aerial victories. Spick also lists Jennewein with 86 aerial victories, including five during the Battle of Britain and further 81 on the Eastern Front, claimed in 271 combat missions. Mathews and Foreman, authors of Luftwaffe Aces - Biographies and Victory Claims, researched the German Federal Archives and found records for 83 aerial victory claims. This number includes five on the Western Front and 78 on the Eastern Front.

Victory claims were logged to a map-reference (PQ = Planquadrat), for example "PQ 44234". These sectors were then subdivided into 36 smaller units to give a location area 3 × 4 km in size.

Awards
 Honour Goblet of the Luftwaffe on 1 March 1943 as Oberfeldwebel and pilot
 German Cross in Gold on 12 April 1943 as Oberfeldwebel in the I./Jagdgeschwader 51
 Knight's Cross of the Iron Cross on 5 December 1943 (posthumously) as Leutnant and pilot in the  1./Jagdgeschwader 51 "Mölders"

See also
List of people who disappeared

Notes

References

Citations

Bibliography

External links
 Biography in Luftwaffe's aces website 

 

1919 births
1943 deaths
FIS Alpine Ski World Cup champions
German male alpine skiers
Luftwaffe personnel killed in World War II
German World War II flying aces
Luftwaffe pilots
Missing in action of World War II
Missing person cases in Russia
Recipients of the Gold German Cross
Recipients of the Knight's Cross of the Iron Cross
Aerial disappearances of military personnel in action
People from Landeck District